Catalina Ilona Io Pérez Salinas (born 1990) is a Chilean lawyer, politician, and activist. She currently serves as a member of the Chamber of Deputies of Chile, representing the Antofagasta Region for the 2022–2026 term, and from January 2019 to June 2021 was president of the Democratic Revolution party.

Biography 
Catalina Pérez Salinas was born in 1990 in Malmö, Sweden, to Ricardo Pérez Miranda and María Ángela Salinas Meza, who were exiled by the military dictatorship. Her family returned to Chile in 1994, settling in the city of Antofagasta.

She attended primary and secondary school from 1997 to 2006 at the Liceo Experimental Artístico in Antofagasta, and she completed her studies in 2007–2008 at the Colegio Academia Tarapacá in Iquique. During the 2006 student protests in Chile, she served as coordinator of secondary students for Antofagasta and one of the movement's regional spokespeople. 

She then enrolled as a law student at Catholic University of the North, graduating as a lawyer in 2017. While at Catholic University of the North, she participated in the 2011–2013 Chilean student protests, representing the university's Faculty of Humanities. She later became the school's Student Center president.

Political career 
Pérez Salinas first became involved in politics at age 13, as an activist with the Communist Youth of Chile. In 2014, she joined the Democratic Revolution party.

In the 2017 Chilean general election, she ran as a candidate for the Chamber of Deputies to represent District 3, as part of the Broad Front coalition. She was elected with 3.76% of the vote to serve a term from 2018–2022. As a member of the Chamber of Deputies, she joined the Permanent Committee on the Environment and Natural Resources, as well as the Interior, Nationality, Citizenship, and Regionalization Committee. She is part of the Broad Front parliamentary committee. 

In January 2019, she was elected president of the Democratic Revolution party, a position she held until June 2021.

She won reelection for a second four-year term in the 2021 Chilean general election.

References 

1990 births
Living people
Chilean women lawyers
21st-century Chilean lawyers
Chilean feminists
Chilean communists
Chilean women activists
Women members of the Chamber of Deputies of Chile
People from Antofagasta
Communist Party of Chile politicians
Democratic Revolution politicians
Chilean diaspora
Members of the Chamber of Deputies of Chile
Catholic University of the North alumni
21st-century Chilean women politicians
21st-century Chilean politicians
Deputies of the LV Legislative Period of the National Congress of Chile